Bernard Carayon (born 1 October 1957, in Paris) was a member of the French parliament.   First elected in Tarn in 1993; he has been then reelected in 2002 and 2007. He is also mayor of Lavaur, a historic city near Toulouse, since 1995.
He is a member of the Union for a Popular Movement. Since 2009, he has been a lecturer at SciencesPo Paris in the department of public affairs.
With a focus on the questions of globalization, he has written two books entitled "Patriotisme économique" and "Changeons le monde" ("Let's change the world"). 
Together with a socialist MP he started a foundation called "Prometheus". Supported by a dozen prominent French companies, Prometheus tries to bridge the gap between the private and the public reflexions about globalization in order to build a genuine economic strategy for France and Europe.

References

1957 births
Living people
Politicians from Paris
The Republicans (France) politicians
The Popular Right
Mayors of places in Occitania (administrative region)
Paris 2 Panthéon-Assas University alumni
Deputies of the 12th National Assembly of the French Fifth Republic
Deputies of the 13th National Assembly of the French Fifth Republic